Dhaneshwar Mandal (D. Mandal) is a retired Professor in Ancient History, Culture and Archaeology at Allahabad University. He is widely known for his strong position against the excavations at the Babri Masjid site in Ayodhya conducted by the Archaeological Survey of India.

Life and career 
Mandal joined the University of Allahabad as an exploration assistant in 1960. He rose to become a Professor and retired in 1993. Even though he has never received a PhD, he has supervised several Ph. D. students.

Mandal is a card-holding member of the Communist Party of India. He never visited a temple or mosque and, consequently, he testified in the Allahabad High Court that he has never witnessed any black basalt columns of the kind found in the Babri Masjid.

Works 
 Radiocarbon dates and Indian archaeology (Vaishali Pub. House, 1972), ASIN B0006CDES2.
 Excavations at Mahagara, 1977-78 (co-authored, University of Allahabad, 1980)
 Beginnings of Agriculture (co-authored with G. R. Sharma et al., Abhinash Prakash, 1980).
 History of Prehistory (co-authored with G. R. Sharma et al., 1980)
 Ayodhya, Archaeology After Demolition: A Critique of the "new" and "fresh" Discoveries (Orient Blackswan, 1993; second edition, 2003), .
 Ayodhya, Archaeology after Excavation (co-authored with S. Ratnagar, Tulika Books, 2007), .

Ayodhya dispute 
Mandal came to prominence with the publication of his book Ayodhya: Archaeology after Demolition in 1994. The book was written in response to two pieces of evidence. In 1990, the archaeologist B. B. Lal had announced that he had discovered pillar bases during his excavation in Ayodhya during 1975–80, next to the Babri Masjid site. This implied that there was another structure, presumably a temple, under the Babri Masjid, and gave rise to considerable consternation among the secularist academic groups. Secondly, after the demolition of Babri Masjid by the Vishva Hindu Parishad and allied groups in 1992, a number of figures and artifacts were discovered in the debris, which formed the basis for a booklet by Y. D. Sharma et al.
Mandal's book was a critique of these two pieces of evidence.  Of the pillar bases discovered by B. B. Lal, Mandal wrote that they were not aligned with one another and that they belonged to different cultural levels.
At the World Archaeology Congress in 1998, Mandal stated that what were thought to be pillar bases were actually part of a wall, despite his prior assertion that they were not in alignment and belonged to different cultural levels. In an article in the New Age magazine in 1999, he also stated that the Gahadavala inscription found in the Babri Masjid debris, attesting to a Vishnu Hari temple, did not fall from the walls of the mosque and it was possibly brought in from elsewhere.

The book was reissued as Ayodhya, Archaeology after Excavation in 2007, along with an introduction and afterword contributed by Shereen Ratnagar. By this time, the Archaeological Survey of India (ASI) had conducted an excavation at the Babri Masjid site, as directed by the Allahabad High Court, and submitted its report. Mandal and Ratnagar had also received permission from the Court to visit the excavation site. In the 2007 version of the book, Mandal and Ratnagar added a critique of the ASI excavations and its report. They stated that the ASI did not record the strata at which architectural finds were found and that the pieces of glazed pottery, glazed tiles and animal bones found at the site, which could be dated to the Sultanate period, were "suppressed." Mandal contended that his analysis of stratigraphy led him to conclude that two significant floods took place during the 4th to 6th centuries AD, resulting in the abandonment of the site until the 13th century AD. This meant, according to him, that it was impossible for a 10th-century shrine and an 11th or 12th century temple to have existed at the same site. On the whole, Mandal and Ratnagar claimed to have found "clinching archaeological evidence" that there was no temple under the mosque.

However, when Mandal appeared as an expert witness for the Sunni Waqf Board in the Babri Masjid-Ram Janmabhoomi case at the Allahabad High Court, the Court found that "the statements made by him in cross examination show[ed] the shallowness of his knowledge in the subject.". He had stated that he never visited Ayodhya prior to 2003. He did not make any examination of the black basalt columns that were part of the mosque. In fact, he claimed that his study did not involve examining the structure above the ground. He stuck to his claim that the stratigraphy and conclusion in the ASI Report were wrong, based on his observation about floods. However, the Court noted that, on p. 156 of his book, he had stated that there was no evidence of floods between 600 AD and 1200 AD. So, they could not have affected the 10th-12th century constructions. His statement reflected "total confusion on his part," according to the Court.
On the whole, the Court found, "the entire opinion of this witness is short of the requirement under Section 45 of the Evidence Act 1872 to qualify as an Expert."

Both Mandal and Ratnagar were held in contempt of court by the Allahabad High Court for having discussed the ASI report in public while the matter was sub judice.

See also 
 Archaeology of Ayodhya

References

Sources

 
 

Living people
20th-century Indian archaeologists
Analysts of Ayodhya dispute
Year of birth missing (living people)
Academic staff of the University of Allahabad
Indian communists
20th-century Indian historians